No. 519 Squadron RAF was a meteorological squadron of the Royal Air Force during the Second World War.

History
No. 519 Squadron was formed on 15 August 1943 at RAF Wick from 1406 Flight, equipped with Handley Page Hampdens and Supermarine Spitfires. Its purpose was collecting meteorological data from the northern waters of the North Sea all the way to Norway. It soon replaced the Hampdens with Lockheed Hudsons and Lockheed Venturas. The squadron base moved on a number of times along the east coast of Scotland but the squadron's role remained the same. In November 1944 the squadron started using the Boeing Fortress, which it operated to the end of the war. With the war over, the squadron standardised on the Halifax Mk.III, until it was disbanded at RAF Leuchars on 31 May 1946.

Aircraft operated

Squadron bases

See also
North Atlantic weather war
List of Royal Air Force aircraft squadrons

References
Notes

Bibliography

External links

 History of No.'s 500–520 Squadrons at RAF Web
 History of No. 519 Squadron on raf.mod.uk

Aircraft squadrons of the Royal Air Force in World War II
519
Military weather units and formations
Military units and formations established in 1943